Yeger may refer to:

 Armenian name of Lazica, a Caucasian former kingdom, now in Abchasia, Georgia
 Russian Carabiniers, from the German Jäger ("hunters", circa rangers) 
 The Russian Red Army version of the Finnish-licensed military camouflage pattern type M05

See also
 Yeager, a surname